is a Japanese historical drama television series starring Ryo Yoshizawa as Shibusawa Eiichi, a Japanese industrialist widely known today as the "father of Japanese capitalism". The series is the 60th NHK taiga drama, premiered on February 14, 2021.

Cast

People of Chiaraijima village

Shibusawa family
Ryo Yoshizawa as Shibusawa Eiichi (also known as Eijirō, Eiichirō, Tokudayū, Tokutarō)
Masahito Kobayashi as young Eiichi
Kaoru Kobayashi as Shibusawa Ichirōemon, Eiichi's father
Emi Wakui as Shibusawa Ei, Eiichi's mother
Eri Murakawa as Shibusawa Naka, Eiichi's older sister
Nanoha Oda as young Naka
Ryōko Fujino as Shibusawa Tei, Eiichi's younger sister
Honoka Yoshida as young Tei
Kengo Kora as Shibusawa Kisaku (later known as Shibusawa Seiichirō), Eiichi's cousin
Shūto Ishikawa as young Kisaku
Riko Narumi as Shibusawa Yoshi, Kisaku's wife
Sei Hiraizumi as Shibusawa Sōsuke, Eiichi's uncle
Mayumi Asaka as Shibusawa Masa, Eiichi's aunt
Rina Ono as Shibusawa Uta, Eiichi's daughter
Chisato Yamasaki as young Uta
Sawa Nimura as Ōuchi Kuni
Yūki Izumisawa as Shibusawa Tokuji
Shō Kasamatsu as Shibusawa Keizo
Kentarō Tamura as Hozumi Nobushige
Kenta Uchino as Sakatani Yoshirō
Akana Ikeda as Shibusawa Kotoko
Yuko Oshima as Itō Kaneko, Eiichi's second wife
Yūki Yagi as Shibusawa Fumiko

Odaka family
Seiichi Tanabe as Odaka Junchū, Chiyo's older brother
Shinnosuke Mitsushima as Odaka Chōshichirō
Kōsei Sutō as young Chōshichirō
Ai Hashimoto as Odaka Chiyo, Eiichi's first wife
Aiko Iwasaki as young Chiyo
Kenshi Okada as Odaka Heikurō (later known as Shibusawa Heikurō), Eiichi's cousin
Haru Takagi as young Heikurō 
Satomi Tezuka as Odaka Yahe, Odaka family's mother
Mai Tezuka as Odaka Kise, Junchū's wife
Mei Hata as Odaka Yū, Junchū's daughter

Mito Domain
Naoto Takenaka as Tokugawa Nariaki, Yoshinobu's father and the 9th Lord of Mito
Hideko Hara as Yoshiko, Yoshinobu's mother
Ayumu Nakajima as Tokugawa Yoshiatsu, Nariaki's eldest son and the 10th Lord of Mito
Rihito Itagaki as Tokugawa Akitake, Yoshiatsu and Yoshinobu's half-brother
Ikkei Watanabe as Fujita Tōko, Nariaki's confidant
Kanji Tsuda as Takeda Kōunsai, Nariaki's confidant
Kisetsu Fujiwara as Fujita Koshirō, Tōko's son

Hitotsubashi House
Tsuyoshi Kusanagi as Tokugawa Yoshinobu, the last shogun
Motoi Kasamatsu as Shichirōmaro (young Yoshinobu)
Shinichi Tsutsumi as Hiraoka Enshirō, Yoshinobu's confidant
Yoshino Kimura as Hiraoka Yasu, Enshirō's wife
Rie Mimura as Tokushin-in, Yoshinobu's grandmother
Rina Kawaei as Mika-gimi (Ichijō Mikako), Yoshinobu's wife
Toshiya Tōyama as Ikai Katsusaburō, Hitotsubashi House's side servant
Kazuki Namioka as Kawamura Ejūrō, Enshirō's subordinate
Kimihiko Hasegawa as Nakane Chōjūrō
Minosuke as Kurokawa Kahei
Hiroyuki Onoue as Hara Ichinoshin

Tokugawa shogunate

Tokugawa family
Yoshi Ikuzō as Tokugawa Ieyoshi, the 12th shogun
Daichi Watanabe (Kuroneko Chelsea) as Tokugawa Iesada, the 13th shogun
Mone Kamishiraishi as Tenshō-in Atsuhime, Iesada's wife
Rie Minemura as Utahashi, Iesada's nanny
Hayato Isomura as Tokugawa Iemochi, the 14th shogun
Mai Fukagawa as Princess Kazu, Iemochi's wife and Emperor Kōmei's younger half-sister

Rōjū
Gorō Kishitani as Ii Naosuke, the tairō
Ryohei Otani as Abe Masahiro, member of Shogun's Council of Elders
Kenta Satoi as Hotta Masayoshi, member of Shogun's Council of Elders
Hiroyuki Sase as Kuze Hirochika
Ryūnosuke Karasawa as Naitō Nobuchika
Rikiya Koyama as Sakai Tadashige
Takeshi Matsumura as Mizuno Tadakiyo

Hatamoto
Mitsuru Hirata as Kawaji Toshiakira, Chief Financial Official
Yasuhi Nakamura as Nagai Naoyuki, Coastal Defense
Satoru Kawaguchi as Iwase Tadanari

Shinsengumi
Keita Machida as Hijikata Toshizō

Others
Jun Shison as Sugiura Aizō
Mansaku Ikeuchi as Kurimoto Joun
Sō Yamanaka as Tanabe Taichi
Akira Okamori as Mukōyama Kazufumi
Yoshihiko Hosoda as Dr. Takamatsu Ryōun
Atsuhiro Inukai as Fukuchi Gen'ichirō
Shinji Takeda as Oguri Kozukenosuke (Tadamasa)
Miō Tanaka as Tanuma Okitaka
Hiroshi Yamamoto as Yamataka Nobuakira

Aizu and Kuwana Domains
Seiichi Kohinata as Matsudaira Katamori
Shunpei Kohinata as Matsudaira Sadaaki

Fukui Domain
Jun Kaname as Matsudaira Yoshinaga, a.k.a. Matsudaira Shungaku, Fukui feudal lord
Teppei Koike as Hashimoto Sanai, Fukui feudal warrior

Satsuma Domain
Shin'ya Niiro as Shimazu Nariakira, 28th Head of the Shimazu clan
Narushi Ikeda as Shimazu Hisamitsu, Lord of Satsuma Domain and the guardian of Shigehisa
Hanamaru Hakata as Saigō Takamori
Kanji Ishimaru as Ōkubo Toshimichi, Hisamitsu's confidant
Yu Tokui as Orita Yōzō
Dean Fujioka as Godai Tomoatsu
Ryūnosuke Matsumura as Mishima Michitsune
Joe Hyūga as Kawamura Sumiyoshi

The imperial court
Onoe Ukon II as Emperor Kōmei, 121st Emperor of Japan
Naoki Inukai as Emperor Meiji, 122nd Emperor of Japan
Suzuri Shibasaki as Prince Sachi
Takaya Yamauchi as Iwakura Tomomi
Yōhei Okuda as Prince Kuni Asahiko
Yuta Kanai as Sanjō Sanetomi
Keiichirō Mori as Nijō Nariyuki
Mizuki Tsujimoto as Empress Eishō
Ryōtarō Okiayu as Ōgimachisanjō Sanenaru
Masami Horiuchi as Nakayama Tadayasu

Foreigners
Morley Robertson as Matthew C. Perry, a commodore of the U.S. Navy
Blake Crawford as Henry A. Adams
Charles Glover as Townsend Harris
René Budeck as Henry Heusken
Kyle Card as Ernest Mason Satow
Ian Moore as Harry Parkes
Alexandre Sagar as Alexander von Siebold
Greg Dale as Paul Flury-Hérard
Didier Carelock as Léon Roches
Jeffrey Rowe as Charles de Montblanc
Julien Jaulin as Napoleon III
Marie Moilliet as Eugénie de Montijo
Nozomi de Lencquesaing as Mermet de Cachon
Arno Le Gall as Leopold II of Belgium
Massimo Biondi as Paul Brunat
Riccardo Balzarini as Alexander Allan Shand
Frederic Benoliel as Ulysses S. Grant
Michelle Take as Julia Grant
Brent Olian as Jesse Grant
Gaetano Totaro as Theodore Roosevelt
Neil Garrison as William Howard Taft
Dong Hao as Sun Yat-sen
Ricky Anderson as Frank A. Vanderlip
Jamie Schyy as George Eastman
Don Johnson as Lyman J. Gage

The new government
Ikusaburo Yamazaki as Itō Hirobumi
Kōji Ōkura as Ōkuma Shigenobu
Aki Asakura as Ōkuma Ayako, Shigenobu's wife
Shūichirō Masuda as Etō Shinpei
Masaki Miura as Maejima Hisoka
Wataru Takagi as Tamano Yofumi
Kaisei Kamimura as Akamatsu Noriyoshi
Seiji Fukushi as Inoue Kaoru
Reika Manaki as Inoue Takeko
Ren Komai as Inoue Sueko
Kazuaki Hankai as Komura Jutarō
Reki Amada as Katō Takaaki
Kenjirō Ishimaru as Hara Takashi
Yoshimasa Kondo as Shidehara Kijūrō
Yoshiyuki Ōmori as Katō Tomosaburō
Masato Mitani as Tokugawa Iesato
Tōsei Ishida as Kaneko Kentarō
Kazunari Uryū as Soeda Juichi

Mitsubishi Group
Nakamura Shikan VIII as Iwasaki Yatarō
Shugo Oshinari as Iwasaki Yanosuke

Others
Kin'ya Kitaōji as Tokugawa Ieyasu, the first shōgun of the Tokugawa shogunate, and the host of the series.
Tōru Watanabe as Umeda Shinnosuke, Armor dealer in Edo
Hiroshi Tamaki as Takashima Shūhan, Western-style gunner
Yoshi Sakō as Tone Yoshiharu, Okabe Domain magistrate
Shunya Itabashi as Sanada Hannosuke, swordsman
Ginnojō Yamazaki as Ōhashi Totsuan, Edo Confucian scholar
Tetsu Watanabe as Kakubei
Tomori Abe as Suma
Shōdai Fukuyama as Kōno Kenzō
Masataka Matsubara as Inokichi
Hajime Yamazaki as Rōro Sakatani
Daikichi Sugawara as Date Munenari, 8th Head of the Uwajima Domain
Ryūshi Mizukami as Yamauchi Yōdō, 15th Head of the Tosa Domain
Takuo Inari as Tokugawa Yoshikatsu, 14th Head of the Owari Domain
Nakamura Mantarō as Fukuzawa Yukichi
Issey Ogata as Minomura Rizaemon
Junpei Yasui as Masuda Takashi
Hisahiro Ogura as Ono Zen'emon
Katsumi Kiba as Ōkubo Ichiō
Yōji Tanaka as Hagiwara Shirobei
Tadashi Ōtake as Hiraoka Junzō
Ryūji Kasahara as Kijima Matabei
Kumi Kureshiro as Masuda Eiko
Takashi Okabe as Ōkura Kihachirō
Rio Kanno as Ōkura Tokuko
Kōki Osamura as Sasaki Yūnosuke
Kanda Hakuzan VI as Kanda Hakuzan II
Jiro Okamoto as Kijūrō
Kōzō Haginoya as Kodama Gentarō
Kazu Murakami as Dr. Takaki
Hiro Ueno as Yasoda Meitarō
Yūichi Yasoda as Kitasato Shibasaburō

TV schedule

Highlight

References

External links
Official Site 

2021 Japanese television series debuts
Taiga drama
Cultural depictions of economists
Cultural depictions of Tokugawa Ieyasu
Cultural depictions of Tokugawa Yoshinobu
Television series set in the 19th century
Television series set in the 20th century
Works about economic history